Meningococcal disease or meningitis describes infections caused by the bacterium Neisseria meningitidis (also termed meningococcus). It has a high mortality rate if untreated but is vaccine-preventable. While best known as a cause of meningitis, it can also result in sepsis, which is an even more damaging and dangerous condition. Meningitis and meningococcemia are major causes of illness, death, and disability in both developed and under-developed countries.

There are approximately 2,600 cases of bacterial meningitis per year in the United States, and on average 333,000 cases in developing countries. The case fatality rate ranges between 10 and 20 percent. The incidence of endemic meningococcal disease during the last 13 years ranges from 1 to 5 per 100,000 in developed countries, and from 10 to 25 per 100,000 in developing countries. During epidemics the incidence of meningococcal disease approaches 100 per 100,000. Meningococcal vaccines have sharply reduced the incidence of the disease in developed countries. 

The disease's pathogenesis is not fully understood. Neisseria meningitidis colonises a substantial proportion of the general population harmlessly, but in a very small percentage of individuals it can invade the bloodstream, affecting the entire body, most notably limbs and brain, causing serious illness. Over the past few years, experts have made an intensive effort to understand specific aspects of meningococcal biology and host interactions; however, the development of improved treatments and effective vaccines is expected to depend on novel efforts by workers in many different fields.

While meningococcal disease is not as contagious as the common cold (which is spread through casual contact), it can be transmitted through saliva and occasionally through close, prolonged general contact with an infected person.

Types

Meningococcemia 
Meningococcemia, like many other gram-negative blood infections, can cause disseminated intravascular coagulation (DIC), which is the inappropriate clotting of blood within the vessels. DIC can cause ischemic tissue damage when upstream thrombi obstruct blood flow and hemorrhage because clotting factors are exhausted. Small bleeds into the skin cause the characteristic petechial rash, which appears with a star-like shape. This is due to the release of toxins into the blood that break down the walls of blood vessels. A rash can develop under the skin due to blood leakage that may leave red or brownish pinprick spots, which can develop into purple bruising. Meningococcal rash can usually be confirmed by a glass test in which the rash does not fade away under pressure.

Meningitis 
Meningococcal meningitis is a form of bacterial meningitis. Meningitis is a disease caused by inflammation and irritation of the meninges, the membranes surrounding the brain and spinal cord. In meningococcal meningitis this is caused by the bacteria invading the cerebrospinal fluid and circulating through the central nervous system. Sub-Saharan Africa, the Americas, Western Europe, the UK, and Ireland still face many challenges combating this disease.

Other types 
As with any gram-negative bacterium, N. meningitidis can infect a variety of sites.

Meningococcal pneumonia can appear during influenza pandemics and in military camps. This is a multilobar, rapidly evolving pneumonia, sometimes associated with septic shock. With prompt treatment, the prognosis is excellent. Another alternative is dexamethasone with vancomycin and meropenem. Pericarditis can appear, either as a septic pericarditis with grave prognosis or as a reactive pericarditis in the wake of meningitis or septicaemia.

Signs and symptoms

Meningitis
The patient with meningococcal meningitis typically presents with high fever, nuchal rigidity (stiff neck), Kernig's sign, severe headache, vomiting, purpura, photophobia, and sometimes chills, altered mental status, or seizures. Diarrhea or respiratory symptoms are less common. Petechiae are often also present, but do not always occur, so their absence should not be used against the diagnosis of meningococcal disease. Anyone with symptoms of meningococcal meningitis should receive intravenous antibiotics before the results of lumbar puncture, as delay in treatment worsens the prognosis.

Meningococcemia
Symptoms of meningococcemia are, at least initially, similar to those of influenza. Typically, the first symptoms include fever, nausea, myalgia, headache, arthralgia, chills, diarrhea, stiff neck, and malaise. Later symptoms include septic shock, purpura, hypotension, cyanosis, petechiae, seizures, anxiety, and multiple organ dysfunction syndrome. Acute respiratory distress syndrome and altered mental status may also occur. The petechial rash appear with the 'star-like' shape. Meningococcal sepsis has a greater mortality rate than meningococcal meningitis, but the risk of neurologic sequelae is much lower.

Pathogenesis 
Meningococcal disease causes life-threatening meningitis and sepsis conditions. In the case of meningitis, bacteria attack the lining between the brain and skull called the meninges. Infected fluid from the meninges then passes into the spinal cord, causing symptoms including stiff neck, fever and rashes. The meninges (and sometimes the brain itself) begin to swell, which affects the central nervous system.

Even with antibiotics, approximately 1 in 10 people who have meningococcal meningitis will die; however, about as many survivors of the disease lose a limb or their hearing, or experience permanent brain damage. The sepsis type of infection is much more deadly, and results in a severe blood poisoning called meningococcal sepsis that affects the entire body. In this case, bacterial toxins rupture blood vessels and can rapidly shut down vital organs. Within hours, patient's health can change from seemingly good to mortally ill.

The N. meningitidis bacterium is surrounded by a slimy outer coat that contains disease-causing endotoxin. While many bacteria produce endotoxin, the levels produced by meningococcal bacteria are 100 to 1,000 times greater (and accordingly more lethal) than normal. As the bacteria multiply and move through the bloodstream, it sheds concentrated amounts of toxin. The endotoxin directly affects the heart, reducing its ability to circulate blood, and also causes pressure on blood vessels throughout the body. As some blood vessels start to hemorrhage, major organs like the lungs and kidneys are damaged.

Patients with meningococcal disease are treated with a large dose of antibiotic. The systemic antibiotic flowing through the bloodstream rapidly kills the bacteria but, as the bacteria are killed, even more toxin is released. It takes up to several days for the toxin to be neutralized from the body by using continuous liquid treatment and antibiotic therapy.

Prevention 
The most important form of prevention is a vaccine against N. meningitidis. Different countries have different strains of the bacteria and therefore use different vaccines. Twelve serogroups (strains) exist with six having the potential to cause a major epidemic - A, B, C, X, Y and W135 are responsible for virtually all cases of the disease in humans. Vaccines are currently available against all six strains, including the newest vaccine against serogroup B. The first vaccine to prevent meningococcal serogroup B (meningitis B) disease was approved by the European Commission on 22 January 2013. The vaccine is manufactured by GlaxoSmithKline and sold under the trade name Bexsero. Bexsero is for use in all age groups from two months of age and older.

Menveo and Mencevax of GlaxoSmithKline Vaccines, Menactra and Menomune of Sanofi-Aventis, and NmVac4-A/C/Y/W-135 (has not been licensed in the US) of JN-International Medical Corporation, are the commonly used vaccines. Vaccines offer significant protection from three to five years (plain polysaccharide vaccine Menomune, Mencevax and NmVac-4) to more than eight years (conjugate vaccine Menactra).

Vaccinations

Children
Children 2–10 years of age who are at high risk for meningococcal disease such as certain chronic medical conditions and travel to or reside in countries with hyperendemic or epidemic meningococcal disease should receive primary immunization. Although safety and efficacy of the vaccine have not been established in children younger than 2 years of age and under outbreak control, the unconjugated vaccine can be considered.

Adolescents
Primary immunization against meningococcal disease with meningitis A, C, Y and W-135 vaccines is recommended for all young adolescents at 11–12 years of age and all unvaccinated older adolescents at 15 years of age. Although conjugate vaccines are the preferred meningococcal vaccine in adolescents 11 years of age or older, polysaccharide vaccines are an acceptable alternative if the conjugated vaccine is unavailable.

Adults
Primary immunization with meningitis A, C, Y and W-135 vaccines is recommended for college students who plan to live in dormitories, although the risk for meningococcal disease for college students 18–24 years of age is similar to that of the general population of similar age.

Routine primary immunization against meningococcal disease is recommended for most adults living in areas where meningococcal disease is endemic or who are planning to travel to such areas. Although conjugate vaccines are the preferred meningococcal vaccine in adults 55 years of age or younger, polysaccharide vaccines are an acceptable alternative for adults in this age group if the conjugated vaccine is unavailable. Since safety and efficacy of conjugate vaccines in adults older than 55 years of age have not been established to date, polysaccharide vaccines should be used for primary immunization in this group.

Medical staff
Health care people should receive routine immunization against meningococcal disease for laboratory personnel who are routinely exposed to isolates of N. meningitidis. Laboratory personnel and medical staff are at risk of exposure to N. meningitides or to patients with meningococcal disease. Hospital Infection Control Practices Advisory Committee (HICPAC) recommendations regarding immunization of health-care workers that routine vaccination of health-care personnel is recommended, Any individual 11–55 years of age who wishes to reduce their risk of meningococcal disease may receive meningitis A, C, Y and W-135 vaccines and those older than 55 years of age. Under certain circumstances if unvaccinated health-care personnel cannot get vaccinated and who have intensive contact with oropharyngeal secretions of infected patients and who do not use proper precautions should receive anti-infective prophylaxis against meningococcal infection (i.e., 2-day regimen of oral rifampicin or a single dose of IM ceftriaxone or a single dose of oral ciprofloxacin).

USA military recruits
Because the risk of meningococcal disease is increased among USA's military recruits, all military recruits routinely receive primary immunization against the disease.

Travelers
Immunization against meningococcal disease is not a requirement for entry into any country, unlike Yellow fever. Only Saudi Arabia requires that travelers to that country for the annual Hajj and Umrah pilgrimage have a certificate of vaccination against meningococcal disease, issued not more than 3 years and not less than 10 days before arrival in Saudi Arabia.

Travelers to or residents of areas where N. meningitidis is highly endemic or epidemic are at risk of exposure should receive primary immunization against meningococcal disease.

HIV-infected individuals
HIV-infected individuals are likely to be at increased risk for meningococcal disease; HIV-infected individuals who wish to reduce their risk of meningococcal disease may receive primary immunization against meningococcal disease. Although efficacy of meningitis A, C, Y and W-135 vaccines have not been evaluated in HIV-infected individuals to date, HIV-infected individuals 11–55 years of age may receive primary immunization with the conjugated vaccine. Vaccination against meningitis does not decrease CD4+ T-cell counts or increase viral load in HIV-infected individuals, and there has been no evidence that the vaccines adversely affect survival.

Close contacts
Protective levels of anticapsular antibodies are not achieved until 7–14 days following administration of a meningococcal vaccine, vaccination cannot prevent early onset disease in these contacts and usually is not recommended following sporadic cases of invasive meningococcal disease. Unlike developed countries, in sub-Saharan Africa and other under developed countries, entire families live in a single room of a house.

Meningococcal infection is usually introduced into a household by an asymptomatic person. Carriage then spreads through the household, reaching infants usually after one or more other household members have been infected. Disease is most likely to occur in infants and young children who lack immunity to the strain of organism circulating and who subsequently acquire carriage of an invasive strain.

By preventing susceptible contacts from acquiring infection by directly inhibiting colonization. Close contacts are defined as those persons who could have had intimate contact with the patient's oral secretions such as through kissing or sharing of food or drink. The importance of the carrier state in meningococcal disease is well known. In developed countries the disease transmission usually occurs in day care, schools and large gatherings where usually disease transmission could occur. Because the meningococcal organism is transmitted by respiratory droplets and is susceptible to drying, it has been postulated that close contact is necessary for transmission. Therefore, the disease transmission to other susceptible person cannot be prevented. Meningitis occurs sporadically throughout the year, and since the organism has no known reservoir outside of man, asymptomatic carriers are usually the source of transmission.

Additionally, basic hygiene measures, such as handwashing and not sharing drinking cups, can reduce the incidence of infection by limiting exposure. When a case is confirmed, all close contacts with the infected person can be offered antibiotics to reduce the likelihood of the infection spreading to other people. However, rifampin-resistant strains have been reported and the indiscriminate use of antibiotics contributes to this problem. Chemoprophylaxis is commonly used to those close contacts who are at highest risk of carrying the pathogenic strains. Since vaccine duration is unknown, mass select vaccinations may be the most cost-effective means for controlling the transmission of the meningococcal disease, rather than mass routine vaccination schedules.

Chronic medical conditions
Persons with component deficiencies in the final common complement pathway (C3, C5-C9) are more susceptible to N. meningitidis infection than complement-satisfactory persons, and it was estimated that the risk of infection is 7000 times higher in such individuals. In addition, complement component-deficient populations frequently experience frequent meningococcal disease since their immune response to natural infection may be less complete than that of complement non-deficient persons.

Inherited properdin deficiency also is related, with an increased risk of contracting meningococcal disease. Persons with functional or anatomic asplenia may not efficiently clear encapsulated Neisseria meningitidis from the bloodstream Persons with other conditions associated with immunosuppression also may be at increased risk of developing meningococcal disease.

Antibiotics 
An updated 2013 Cochrane review investigated the effectiveness of different antibiotics for prophylaxis against meningococcal disease and eradication of N. meningitidis particularly in people at risk of being carriers. The systematic review included 24 studies with 6,885 participants. During follow up no cases of meningococcal disease were reported and thus true antibiotic preventative measures could not be directly assessed. However, the data suggested that rifampin, ceftriaxone, ciprofloxacin and penicillin were equally effective for the eradication of N. meningitidis in potential carriers, although rifampin was associated with resistance to the antibiotic following treatment. Eighteen studies provided data on side effects and reported they were minimal but included nausea, abdominal pain, dizziness and pain at injection site.

Disease outbreak control
Meningitis A, C, Y and W-135 vaccines can be used for large-scale vaccination programs when an outbreak of meningococcal disease occurs in Africa and other regions of the world. Whenever sporadic or cluster cases or outbreaks of meningococcal disease occur in the US, chemoprophylaxis is the principal means of preventing secondary cases in household and other close contacts of individuals with invasive disease. Meningitis A, C, Y and W-135 vaccines rarely may be used as an adjunct to chemoprophylaxis,1 but only in situations where there is an ongoing risk of exposure (e.g., when cluster cases or outbreaks occur) and when a serogroup contained in the vaccine is involved.

It is important that clinicians promptly report all cases of suspected or confirmed meningococcal disease to local public health authorities and that the serogroup of the meningococcal strain involved be identified. The effectiveness of mass vaccination programs depends on early and accurate recognition of outbreaks. When a suspected outbreak of meningococcal disease occurs, public health authorities will then determine whether mass vaccinations (with or without mass chemoprophylaxis) is indicated and delineate the target population to be vaccinated based on risk assessment.

Treatment

When meningococcal disease is suspected, treatment must be started immediately and should not be delayed while waiting for investigations. Treatment in primary care usually involves prompt intramuscular administration of benzylpenicillin, and then an urgent transfer to hospital (hopefully, an academic level I medical center, or at least a hospital with round the clock neurological care, ideally with neurological intensive and critical care units) for further care. Once in the hospital, the antibiotics of choice are usually IV broad spectrum 3rd generation cephalosporins, e.g., cefotaxime or ceftriaxone. Benzylpenicillin and chloramphenicol are also effective. Supportive measures include IV fluids, oxygen, inotropic support, e.g., dopamine or dobutamine and management of raised intracranial pressure. Steroid therapy may help in some adult patients, but is unlikely to affect long term outcomes.

There is some debate on which antibiotic is most effective at treating the illness. A systematic review compared two antibiotics. There was one trial: an open label (not blinded) non-inferiority trial of 510 people comparing two different types of antibiotics; ceftriaxone (in which there were 14 deaths out of 247), and chloramphenicol (12 deaths out of 256). There were no reported side effects. Both antibiotics were considered equally effective. Antibiotic choice should be based on local antibiotic resistance information.

Prognosis

Complications
Complications following meningococcal disease can be divided into early and late groups. Early complications include: raised intracranial pressure, disseminated intravascular coagulation, seizures, circulatory collapse and organ failure. Later complications are: deafness, blindness, lasting neurological deficits, reduced IQ, and gangrene leading to amputations.

Epidemiology

Africa 

The importance of meningitis disease is as significant in Africa as HIV, TB and malaria. Cases of meningococcemia leading to severe meningoencephalitis are common among young children and the elderly. Deaths occurring in less than 24 hours are more likely during the disease epidemic seasons in Africa and Sub-Saharan Africa is hit by meningitis disease outbreaks throughout the epidemic season. It may be that climate change contributes significantly the spread of the disease in Benin, Burkina Faso, Cameroon, the Central African Republic, Chad, Côte d'Ivoire, the Democratic Republic of the Congo, Ethiopia, Ghana, Mali, Niger, Nigeria and Togo. This is an area of Africa where the disease is endemic: meningitis is "silently" present, and there are always a few cases. When the number of cases passes five per population of 100,000 in one week, teams are on alert. Epidemic levels are reached when there have been 100 cases per 100,000 populations over several weeks.

Further complicating efforts to halt the spread of meningitis in Africa is the fact that extremely dry, dusty weather conditions which characterize Niger and Burkina Faso from December to June favor the development of epidemics. Overcrowded villages are breeding grounds for bacterial transmission and lead to a high prevalence of respiratory tract infections, which leave the body more susceptible to infection, encouraging the spread of meningitis. IRIN Africa news has been providing the number of deaths for each country since 1995, and a mass vaccination campaign following a community outbreak of meningococcal disease in Florida was done by the CDC.

Florida 
As of June 2022, there is an ongoing outbreak of the disease in Florida. The CDC has identified 26 cases of the disease. Seven deaths have been attributed to the disease.

History and etymology 
From the Greek meninx (membrane) + kokkos (berry), meningococcal disease was first described by Gaspard Vieusseux during an outbreak in Geneva in 1805. In 1884, Italian pathologists Ettore Marchiafava and Angelo Celli described intracellular micrococci in cerebrospinal fluid, and in 1887, Anton Wiechselbaum identified the meningococcus (designated as Diplococcus intracellularis meningitidis) in cerebrospinal fluid and established the connection between the organism and epidemic meningitis.

See also 
 Endocarditis
 Pathogenic bacteria
 Waterhouse–Friderichsen syndrome
 African meningitis belt
 2009–10 West African meningitis outbreak
 Meningococcal vaccine
 Meningitis Vaccine Project

References

Further reading

External links 

 

Bacterial diseases
Bacterium-related cutaneous conditions
Sepsis
Vaccine-preventable diseases